Workers' Power is a Trotskyist group which forms the British section of the League for the Fifth International. The group publishes the newspaper Workers Power and distributes the English-language journal Fifth International.

Origin 
The group originated in the International Socialists (IS) as the Left Faction. The Faction argued that IS needed a fully developed programme. It also criticised the stance IS adopted on the Provisional Irish Republican Army's paramilitary actions in 1972. In 1973, it set up a faction, then when it refused to dissolve in 1974 it was excluded from IS and formed the Workers Power Group. In 1975, it briefly joined with Workers Fight to form the International-Communist League which split into its constituent parts soon afterward.

In 1980, Workers Power abandoned the position that the Stalinist states were state capitalist, seeing this position as an error on the part of Tony Cliff who argued that the USSR was state capitalist, functioning as a giant company which competed on the world market militarily. In that year it co-published "The Degenerated Revolution" which argued that countries other than the USSR (such as those in Eastern Europe and Cuba) were "degenerate workers states" and "degenerate from birth", representing a nuance to the Fourth International's 1948 analysis that the USSR was a degenerated workers state while the other countries were deformed workers' states.

Activity and alliances 
In the mid-1980s Workers Power was involved in solidarity around the miners strike, arguing for a general strike against the Tories and for picket line defence against police violence towards strikers. Workers Power was active in the anti-fascist movement against the National Front and the British National Party. Towards the end of the 1990s, it was a key organiser in the Coalition Against BP in Colombia, highlighting abuse or workers and environmental giant by British Petroleum. Workers Power members were involved in No Sweat along with the Alliance for Workers Liberty until 2002.

In 1995 Workers Power founded a youth organisation, Revolution, which was politically independent though closely linked to the group. Revolution played an active role in the anti-capitalist and anti-war movements.

Workers Power took part in the Socialist Alliance, standing a candidate in the London GLA elections in 2000 and in the general election in 2001. They subsequently withdrew in 2004 as the Socialist Workers Party prepared to drop the Socialist Alliance and launch the Respect Party coalition, which Workers Power argued was a reformist, populist and cross-class alliance which would be unstable politically. In the General Election of 2010, Jeremy Drinkall stood as an Anticapitalist - Workers Power candidate in the Vauxhall constituency in South London. He polled 109 votes (0.3%).

Workers' Power called for a rank and file movement in the trade unions, and for a new mass workers' party in Britain. The group grew in recent years through work in the student and anti-war movements. Members in the National Union of Rail, Maritime and Transport Workers won support for a resolution calling for a conference to discuss the formation of a new workers party, which led to the RMT sponsored conference in London in January 2006 on the crisis of working class representation, which was attended by over 350 people. Workers Power subsequently joined the Socialist Party-initiated Campaign for a New Workers' Party, even though they were critical of some of its formulations in the original statement (arguing the need for the party to be revolutionary from the start). They left the CNWP in 2007.

Internationally Workers Power were strong advocates of the Social Forum movement, attending both the World Social Forum and European Social Forums. Their position was that the international forums providing a basis for launching a Fifth International in the struggle against globalisation and the international institutions such as the International Monetary Fund and World bank.

Workers Power participated in the discussions on the Left after the 2009 European Elections on left unity, arguing for a conference to create a new workers' party which they argued should form in the same way as the French New Anticapitalist Party through local committees focused both around developing a programme and organising action.

In the austerity crisis in Britain after the 2008 credit crunch, Workers Power was involved in the local anti-cuts groups and the student organisation National Campaign Against Fees and Cuts. Its main slogans were for the creation of a rank and file movement in the trade unions, a national anti cuts federation and for a general strike against the cuts.

In 2013 Workers Power members and supports entered and formed the Class Struggle Platform in Left Unity. In January 2014 Workers Power entered unity talks with Socialist Resistance and the International Socialist Network (ISN), although the ISN has since dissolved itself.

Dissolution 
In September 2015 Workers Power dissolved, calling for all socialists to join the Labour Party. Former members formed the Red Flag Platform, describing itself as "a revolutionary socialist initiative campaigning in the Labour Party". It published the first issue of its newspaper, Red Flag, in November 2015.

Relaunch 
In August 2021, Workers Power was relaunched, stating that after 6 years of fighting for democracy in the Labour Party, being part of the struggle against Brexit, and organising anti-racist and anti-fascist mobilisations, Labour was no longer the central issue of the day. The group re-emphasised its own revolutionary tradition going back to 1975 as Workers Power and reaffirmed its international links with its sections in Europe, Asia and the Americas.

Theory

The degenerated revolution in Russia, and the degenerate workers states

Other theory 
The League emphasises the transitional programme and incorporates political demands in their publications. They also advocate a strategy of permanent revolution (i.e., not in stages, and in the impossibility of the bourgeois in semi-colonial countries leading revolutions). They support Lenin's analysis of imperialism as a higher stage of capitalism based on international capital concentrated in the 'developed' western world, rather than simply as militarism and war. In 2010 the League adopted the position that China had become imperialist.

Publications 
Workers Power published the journal of the League for the Fifth International, called Fifth International. This included a special edition entitled "The Credit Crunch – A Marxist Analysis". The last edition appeared in Autumn 2010.
 
Workers Power has also published many pamphlets and books, the two most important in terms of their tradition being Death Agony of the Fourth International and The Degenerated Revolution. Other pamphlets include "Marxism and the Trade Unions", "Women's Oppression", "Black Liberation", "LGBT Liberation", a critique of the SWP/Cliff tradition and on the crisis of Stalinism after 1989.

In 2007 they republished "The Road to Red October", a pamphlet originally released in 1987, to commemorate the 90th anniversary of the Russian Revolution.

In 2018 they published "Against The Racist Endeavour" which charts the struggles of the Palestinians against colonial oppression, invasive settlement, mass expulsion and war.

Splits 
Marxist Worker was a Trotskyist organisation in Britain, which produced a publication of the same name. It was formed by the Bolton branch of Workers' Fight, who opposed that organisation's merger with Workers' Power in 1976 and refused to enter the new organisation, the International-Communist League. The group also had supporters in Wigan. The Marxist Worker group merged with the International Marxist Group later in the 1970s. Some members instead joined Big Flame, the IMG's partner in the Socialist Unity electoral bloc.

In 2006 the League for the Fifth International suffered a split which particularly affected the British section. The minority, which left to form Permanent Revolution, believed that the world economy was in a long upward wave (a position they adopted from Ernest Mandel) and that the possibility of a crisis of capitalism was unlikely for several more years. They criticised the majority as having an overly optimistic perspective or a pre-revolutionary period.

In 2012, two further groups split, 2 members left due to their criticism of Workers Power's position on the NATO intervention in Libya where Workers Power supported the uprising against Muammar Gaddafi, and 16 more left to launch what the majority described as the "liquidationist" Anti-Capitalist Initiative, the latter reducing Workers Power's membership by about a third.

Paul Mason (journalist) is a former member of the Workers' Power group. He responded to an interviewer from the Evening Standard in 2011: "It's on Wikipedia that I was, so it must be true. It's fair to say I was a Leftie activist. What my politics are now are very complicated." In an interview with The Independent in 2015, he described himself as having been a "supporter" of the group.

See also 
 League for the Fifth International – The international to which Workers Power is affiliated. See for more on theory and history.
 List of political parties in the United Kingdom opposed to austerity
 Revolution – The youth group founded by Workers Power

References

External links 
 Workers Power
 League for the Fifth International
 The Degenerated Revolution
 Death Agony of the Fourth International

Political parties established in 1974
Political parties disestablished in 2015
Defunct Trotskyist organisations in the United Kingdom
League for the Fifth International
Anti-austerity political parties in the United Kingdom
2015 disestablishments in the United Kingdom